Dr. Theodor Haltenorth (May 18, 1910 – January 30, 1981) was a German mammalogist. He worked mainly in Munich, Bavaria, Germany, and was a key figure in the Quagga Project. He also taxonomised the Cretan wildcat in 1953.

1910 births
1981 deaths
20th-century German zoologists